Tenorioconus is a synonym of Conus (Stephanoconus) Mörch, 1852,: synonym of Conus Linnaeus, 1758. These are sea snails, marine gastropod mollusks in the family Conidae, the cone snails and their allies.

Species
The following species are alternate representation:
 Tenorioconus monicae Petuch & Berschauer, 2015
 Tenorioconus rosi Petuch & Berschauer, 2015
 Tenorioconus archon (Broderip, 1833): synonym of Conus archon Broderip, 1833 (alternate representation)
 Tenorioconus aurantius (Hwass in Bruguière, 1792): synonym of Conus aurantius Hwass in Bruguière, 1792 (alternate representation)
 Tenorioconus caracanus (Hwass in Bruguière, 1792): synonym of Conus cedonulli insularis Gmelin, 1791 (alternate representation)
 Tenorioconus cedonulli (Linnaeus, 1767): synonym of Conus cedonulli Linnaeus, 1767 (alternate representation)
 Tenorioconus curassaviensis (Hwass in Bruguière, 1792): synonym of Conus curassaviensis Hwass in Bruguière, 1792 (alternate representation)
 Tenorioconus dominicanus (Hwass in Bruguière, 1792): synonym of Conus cedonulli dominicanus Hwass in Bruguière, 1792 (alternate representation)
 Tenorioconus duffyi (Petuch, 1992): synonym of Conus duffyi Petuch, 1992 (alternate representation)
 Tenorioconus granarius (Kiener, 1845): synonym of Conus mappa granarius Kiener, 1845 (alternate representation)
 Tenorioconus harlandi (Petuch, 1987): synonym of Conus harlandi Petuch, 1987 (alternate representation)
 Tenorioconus insularis (Gmelin, 1791): synonym of Conus cedonulli insularis Gmelin, 1791 (alternate representation)
 Tenorioconus julieandreae (Cargile, 1995): synonym of Conus julieandreae Cargile, 1995 (alternate representation)
 Tenorioconus mappa (Lightfoot, 1786): synonym of Conus mappa Lightfoot, 1786 (alternate representation)
 Tenorioconus panamicus (Petuch, 1990): synonym of Conus mappa granarius Kiener, 1845 (alternate representation)
 Tenorioconus pseudaurantius (Vink & Cosel, 1985): synonym of Conus pseudaurantius Vink & Cosel, 1985 (alternate representation)
 Tenorioconus sanguineus (Kiener, 1850): synonym of Conus sanguineus Kiener, 1850
 Tenorioconus solidus (Gmelin, 1791): synonym of Conus solidus Gmelin, 1791
 Tenorioconus trinitarius (Hwass in Bruguière, 1792): synonym of Conus mappa trinitarius Hwass in Bruguière, 1792 (alternate representation)

The species Protoconus hanshassi Lorenz & Barbier, 2012 is a cone from the Philippines, discovered in 2012 and improperly categorized under the invalid junior homonym Protoconus (According to the World Register of Marine Species the genus Protoconus da Motta, 1991 is accepted as Tenorioconus Petuch & Drolshagen, 2011), hence it is more properly known as Tenorioconus hanshassi, synonym of Conus hanshassi (Lorenz & Barbier, 2012) ''.

References

 Puillandre N., Duda T.F., Meyer C., Olivera B.M. & Bouchet P. (2015). One, four or 100 genera? A new classification of the cone snails. Journal of Molluscan Studies. 81: 1-23

External links
 To World Register of Marine Species

Conidae